Matthew the Scot (died 1229) was a 13th-century Scottish cleric.

Biography
Matthew had been the Chancellor of Scotland in the late reign of king Alexander II of Scotland. He was appointed in 1227 after the death of Thomas, Archdeacon of Lothian. His name indicates that he was a Gael or had some personal connection with Gaeldom, but we do not know anything else about his background, other than perhaps the fact that he supposedly had some kind of defect of birth. Matthew was postulated to the see of Aberdeen, before in turn being postulated to the higher-ranking See of Dunkeld.  He was not consecrated as bishop of Aberdeen, and probably died before being consecrated for Dunkeld. He died in 1229.

References
Dowden, John, The Bishops of Scotland, ed. J. Maitland Thomson, (Glasgow, 1912)

Bishops of Aberdeen
Bishops of Dunkeld (non consecrated, titular or doubtful)
13th-century Scottish Roman Catholic bishops
Lord chancellors of Scotland
Medieval Gaels from Scotland
12th-century births
1229 deaths